"You Always Come Back (To Hurting Me)" is a song co-written and recorded by American country music artist Johnny Rodriguez.  It was released in March 1973 as the second single from the album Introducing Johnny Rodriguez.  It was Rodriguez's second hit on the U.S. country music chart and first number one. The single spent one week at the top and a total of twelve weeks on the chart.  The song was written by Rodriguez and Tom T. Hall.

The song made Rodriguez, who was 21 at the time, the youngest male artist to chart a number 1 country hit. This record stood until 2012, when it was broken by Hunter Hayes' "Wanted".

Chart performance

References

1973 singles
Johnny Rodriguez songs
Songs written by Tom T. Hall
Song recordings produced by Jerry Kennedy
Mercury Records singles
1973 songs
Songs written by Johnny Rodriguez